The Santa Maria Valley is an American Viticultural Area (AVA) which straddles the boundary of Santa Barbara and San Luis Obispo counties in California's multi-county Central Coast AVA. It was established on August 5, 1981, by the Alcohol and Tobacco Tax and Trade Bureau (TTB) as California's second oldest AVA. A portion of the AVA crosses the Cuyama River into the southernmost corner of San Luis Obispo County. The result is a mild Mediterranean climate that lengthens the growing season and contributes to the eventual sugar/acid balance in the grapes from Santa Maria Valley's  cultivated vineyards. On January 28, 2011, the AVA was granted an  expansion to its southern boundary.

History 
Santa Maria Valley has a rich viticulture history in California. Grape-growing in the region dates back to the Mexican Colonial period of the 1830s. Modern viticulture in the Santa Maria Valley dates back to the 1964, when more than 100 acres of vineyards were planted in the Santa Maria Valley. The new growers believed the area could grow wine grapes to rival the Napa Valley.

Geography 
The Santa Maria Valley is a natural funnel-shaped valley opening west to the Pacific Ocean.

Climate 

The Santa Maria Valley geography channels dense banks of morning fog from the Pacific Ocean that takes many hours to burn off, only to be replaced by chilly afternoon breezes. This “maritime fringe” climate lengthens the growing season and contributes to the eventual sugar/acid balance in the grapes from the region. Summer in the Santa Maria Valley is goose-bump season, with an average summer temperature  of only . This is a growing environment that is a Region I on the Winkler Scale. As with most of Santa Barbara County, annual rainfall is very low in the Santa Maria Valley. Vines typically require  of water per year for dry-farming, therefore, irrigation is essential.

Soil 
The soils range in texture from a sandy loam to clay loam and are free from adverse salts.  Soil variation can broadly be cut into four types. Three types are within the original Santa Maria Valley AVA: the Valley floor, the Solomon Hills, and the foothills of the Sierra Madre Mountains, northeast of the Santa Maria River. The fourth is the southern expansion area. Along the northern portion of the Santa Maria-Sisquoc River colluvial soils cover slope sides giving rocky freshness to grapes grown throughout. Towards the river side, soils become unconsolidated as mixed alluvial soils appear. The soils are mainly sand, sandy loam, and loam on the valley floor, but are mixed sandy, clay, shaly and silt loams on mountain slopes. However, the soils in the expansion area are the same type as in the original Santa Maria Valley area. In the expansion area and on hills in the original viticultural area, the soils are sand, sandy, clay, and shaly loams.

Varieties Grown 
Due to the cooler mesoclimates, the valley is renowned for producing some of California's finest Pinot Noir and Chardonnay wines. These are the appellation's two flagship varieties.

Expansion 

On January 28, 2011, the TTB granted a petition to expand the southern border of the Santa Maria Valley AVA to align with the physical watershed boundary of the Santa Maria River. The revised boundary approximately follows the ridge line dividing the Santa Maria Valley from the Los Alamos Valley. It lies in northern Santa Barbara County, according to the boundary description and USGS maps, and is entirely within the Central Coast viticultural area.

References

External links 

 Santa Maria Valley  Santa Barbara Vintners Association
 TTB AVA Map

American Viticultural Areas of California
American Viticultural Areas of Southern California
Geography of San Luis Obispo County, California
Geography of Santa Barbara County, California
Valleys of San Luis Obispo County, California
Valleys of Santa Barbara County, California
American Viticultural Areas
1981 establishments in California